is the 13th single by the Japanese girl idol group Berryz Kobo. It was released in Japan on March 7, 2007, and debuted at number 11 in the weekly Oricon singles chart.

Track listings

CD single 
 
  
 "Very Beauty" (Instrumental)
 
 Limited Edition A DVD Excerpts from the concert "Hello! Project 2007 Winter ~Wonderful Hearts Otome Gocoro~"

DVD single Very Beauty Single V 
 "Very Beauty"
 "Very Beauty" (Dance Shot Ver.)

Charts

References

External links 
 Profile Up-Front Works
 Profile of the corresponding DVD single Up-Front Works

2007 singles
2007 songs
Japanese-language songs
Berryz Kobo songs
Songs written by Tsunku
Piccolo Town singles
Electropop songs
Dance-pop songs